James Bernard Williams (May 15, 1926 – June 6, 2016) was a Canadian professional baseball outfielder, coach and manager. He played, coached, and managed in the minor leagues, and was a first base coach in Major League Baseball (MLB), primarily with the Baltimore Orioles. He is an inductee of the Canadian Baseball Hall of Fame.

Playing career
Williams played in the farm system of the Brooklyn/Los Angeles Dodgers during 1947–1964 and although he never was called to the major leagues as a player, Williams enjoyed several highly productive seasons. In his first year as a professional, split between three Dodgers farm teams in the lower minors, Williams batted a composite .367 with 15 triples, 121 runs batted in, 24 stolen bases and 12 home runs. He played three seasons (1955–1957) of Triple-A baseball in his native Canada with the Montreal Royals of the International League, batting .329 in 1955 with 93 runs scored, 33 doubles, eight triples, 13 homers, and 21 stolen bases, and also exceeded the .300 mark with the 1958 Spokane Indians of the Pacific Coast League.

Manager and coach
Williams began managing in the Dodgers farm system in 1963, then went on to manage in minor league baseball through 1980, where he compiled a record of 1,155 wins and 1,156 defeats (.499). His most significant achievement was his tenure coaching first base with the Baltimore Orioles (1981–1987), a run which included their historic 1983 World Series win. 

Williams then followed former Baltimore general manager Hank Peters to the Cleveland Indians, where Williams served as director of field operations in the club's farm system. He retired in 1988.

Personal life 
Williams graduated from De La Salle College School of Toronto, where he played varsity baseball, hockey (as a right wing), football and lacrosse.

Williams met his first wife, Lorraine Elliott, while playing for the Pueblo Dodgers in 1949, with whom he had three children, Chris, Kirk and Julie. When he was not playing winter baseball in Caracas, San Juan or Havana they made their home in Pueblo, Colorado. He was very handy with tools, worked construction (building houses), and was frequently adding rooms or moving walls in their home. In 1988, he married Carole Garrett of Baltimore, and continued his home-improvement work in the off season; their wedding date was inscribed on the front porch of their home in Joppa, Maryland.

In 1991, Williams was inducted to the Canadian Baseball Hall of Fame. Williams died in 2016 at age 90 in Baltimore, survived by his wife Carole and their son Jamie.

Minor league managing career
Santa Barbara Rancheros (1963)
Grand Forks Dodgers (1964)
Shelby Rebels (1965)
Leesburg Athletics (1966–1967) – Championship in 1966
Peninsula Grays (1968)
Iowa Oaks (1969)
Columbus Astros (1970) – Championship
Oklahoma City 89ers (1971)
Cocoa Astros (1972)
Denver Bears (1973)
Columbus Astros (1974)
Lodi Dodgers (1976)
Albuquerque Dukes (1977)
Miami Orioles (1978) – Championship
Charlotte O's (1979–80) – Championship in 1980

Sources
Howe News Bureau, 1985 Baltimore Orioles Organization Book. St. Petersburg, Florida: The Baseball Library, 1985.

References

External links

1926 births
2016 deaths
Atlanta Crackers players
Baltimore Orioles coaches
Baseball people from Ontario
Canadian Baseball Hall of Fame inductees
Canadian baseball players
Danville Dodgers players
Elmira Pioneers players
Grand Forks Chiefs players
Houston Astros coaches
Kingston Dodgers players
Major League Baseball first base coaches
Minor league baseball managers
Mobile Bears players
Montreal Royals players
Omaha Dodgers players
Pueblo Dodgers players
St. Paul Saints (AA) players
Santa Barbara Rancheros players
Sheboygan Indians players
Spokane Indians players
Baseball players from Toronto
Trois-Rivières Royals players
Victoria Rosebuds players